Pankaj Sona (born 3 November 1993) is an Indian professional footballer who plays as a forward for Churchill Brothers in the I-League.

Career
Born in Jharsuguda, Odisha, Sona was encouraged by his uncle, a district level footballer himself, to attend trials with the Government Sports Hostel. Even while at the academy, Sona was considered a very raw talent and also needed to learn the basics about injuries and how to recover. In 2010, after participating in the Biju Patnaik Gold Cup in Bhubaneswar, Sona was awarded as the best player of the tournament. Despite this achievement, officials from the Tata Football Academy, who were scouting during the tournament, originally didn't select Sona for trials with the academy. Sona's coach, Gangadhar Behera, managed to intervene with the Tata officials and Sona was added to the list of trialists. After the trial of 20 players from the tournament, Sona was the only one selected to join the academy.

Sona graduated from the Tata Football Academy in 2012 and soon signed a professional contract with the All India Football Federation developmental I-League side, Pailan Arrows. However, a year later, the club disbanded and Sona decided to pursue academics before being informed of trials with Churchill Brothers in Goa. Sona reportedly skipped his classes to catch a plane to Goa and attend the trials, where he impressed Churchill Brothers officials and coaches. He began playing first-team matches for the club in the Goa Professional League.

On 7 March 2017, three years after signing with the club, Sona made his professional debut for the club in the I-League against East Bengal. He came on as an 86th-minute substitute for Brandon Fernandes as Churchill Brothers won 2–1.

International
Sona has represented India at the under-20 and under-23 levels. For the under-20 side, Sona traveled with the side to China in 2011 for the Weifang Cup. Sona represented the under-23 side in practice matches but never competitively.

Career statistics

References

1993 births
Living people
People from Odisha
Indian footballers
Indian Arrows players
Churchill Brothers FC Goa players
Association football forwards
Footballers from Odisha
Goa Professional League players
I-League players
India youth international footballers